Abu Bakr Shu‘bah Ibn ‘Ayyash Ibn Salim al-Asadi al-Kufi an-Nahshali (died 809 CE), more commonly known as Shu'bah, is a significant figure in the history of Qur'an reading. He was a native of Kufa. Like Hafs, Shu'bah narrated the method of reading from Aasim ibn Abi al-Najud, though the reading of Hafs is more well known in the Muslim world today.

Shady Nasser quotes ad-Dhahabi as bringing a report that Shu'bah rejected the reading of his contemporary Hamzah az-Zaiyyat as bid'ah.

References

710s births

809 deaths
Year of birth uncertain
8th-century Arabs

Quranic readings
Taba‘ at-Tabi‘in hadith narrators